is a Japanese manga series by Jun Yuzuki. It was serialized in the monthly  manga magazine Bessatsu Friend from 2002 to 2005. A live-action television drama adaptation was broadcast on TV Tokyo from October to December 2005.

Plot

Pink no Idenshi is a series of unrelated short stories about high school girls exploring romantic and sexual relationships with their classmates and teachers. Volumes 2, 4, and 5 feature an ongoing plot about Natsu Saitō and Taichi Kobayashi, two high school students who have just begun dating, exploring the conflicts and misunderstandings they face in their newfound relationship.

Cast and characters

Main characters

Played by: Hiroki Nakadoi
Taichi is a shy teen who attracts the attention of both men and women. When Natsu confesses her love for him, he accepts her affection and they both leave the classroom in front of their teacher. He becomes a target for the "Virgin Killer", who is the school nurse, and is helped by Natsu. Later on, he becomes a target of Kirinoin Tsukasa, a male teacher who becomes infatuated with him and Natsu. 

Played by: 
Natsu is an outgoing teen with a crush on Taichi. She confesses her love to him and he returns her feelings. After the confession, they both leave the classroom in front of their teacher. When her boyfriend becomes the target of the "Virgin Killer", she saves him before it's too late. When she and Taichi become targets of Kirinoin, she attempts to put a stop to it, only to have the teacher try to crush her self-esteem and convince her that her relationship with Taichi won't last. By the end, she overcomes the thoughts and refuses to leave Taichi, even when both of them are kidnapped by the obsessed teacher. 

Played by: 
Hikaru is a classmate and friend of both Taichi and Natsu. Throughout the series, they stick up for him when he his made fun of by other classmates and he, in turn, helps them through their troubles. In episode ten, he walks in when Kirinoin has Taichi pinned to a bed locked in a kiss. However, Kirinoin threatens to kill Hikaru's pet hamster, Angelina, if he interferes.

Played by: 
Satoshi is Natsu and Taichi's teacher, who watches them confess their love for each other and abandon class together. Despite demanding order in his classroom, when he sees the shy Taichi fall for the outgoing Natsu, he is happy for the newly-formed couple.

Played by: 
Kaoruko is a school nurse known as a "Virgin Killer" throughout Phoenix High School. After meeting Taichi, she becomes infatuated with his innocence and virginity and demands to make him her next target. She locks him in the office with her, where she attempts to take his virginity. Unsuccessful, she drugs him and kidnaps him. Taichi manages to escape, though in an induced stupor. 

Played by:  
Kirinoin is a male teacher who becomes obsessed with Taichi and Natsu, becoming jealous of their relationship. He tries to manipulate the two, trying to convince them that their love is false and a "fragile relationship." While he fails at breaking Natsu, he succeeds with Taichi, who he forces onto a bed and kisses. Before he can advance, Hikaru walks in to see a numb Taichi and the sadistic amusement of Kirinoin. With his obsession in full-throttle, he kidnaps both Taichi and Natsu.

Other characters
Manami Fuku as Rise Shibata
Hiro Mizushima as Mizuki Iskushima
Jun Natsukawa as Ayase Saiki
Mitsuru Karahashi as Masaya Fujiki
Eri Sakai as Yumeka Shindō
Shoichi Matsuda as Toworu Kurosawa
Misaki Momose as Nao Matsuda
Ryunosuke Kawai as Miriwo Kinoshita
Takayo Kashiwagi as Madoka Mizue
Motoki Ochiai as Daisuke Yuki
Meguru Ishii as Chizuru Kanno
Yu Shirota as Maki Nakajō
Takuya as Senri Nakajō

Media

Manga
Pink no Idenshi is written and illustrated by Jun Yuzuki. It was serialized in the monthly manga magazine Bessatsu Friend from 2002 to 2005. The chapters were later released in 7 bound volumes by Kodansha under the Bessatsu Friend Comics imprint.

While Pink no Idenshi largely contains a series of unrelated short stories, volumes 2, 4, and 5 feature an ongoing plot about Natsu Saitō and Taichi Kobayashi.

TV drama

A live-action television drama adaptation was broadcast from October 3 to December 26, 2005 on TV Tokyo. It was produced by Masayuki Iwata with screenplay by Haruko Nagatsu. The series starred Lead member Hiroki Nakadoi as Taichi Kobayashi, Narumi Konno as Natsu Saitō, Zenjiro as Satoshi Hanamura, Makoto Sakamoto as Hikaru Chikubushima, Kaoru Sumiya as Kaoruko Hojo and Tsuyoshi Kimura as Tsukasa Kirinoin. The series' opening theme song is "Ranning" by The Phanky Okstra and the ending theme is "Play With the Numbers" by Hinoi Team.

All thirteen episodes were released on DVD on February 25, 2006. The series was later re-compiled and released as several discounted volumes: "Abunai Hōkago" and "Ōji-sama no Mitsu no Aji" were released as vol. 1 on October 27, 2006; "Ubatte Darling" and "Furachi na Kyōshi" were released as vol. 2; and "Kiken na Sankaku Kankei" and "Kiss Kiss Kiss" were released as vol. 3 on November 24, 2006. Natsu and Taichi's story arc was compiled as vol. 4 under the subtitle Taichi & Natsu and released on December 15, 2006.

References

External links
 Official TV drama website

Kodansha manga
School life in anime and manga
Shōjo manga
TV Tokyo original programming